Christian Duma (born 5 February 1982, in Cluj-Napoca) is a German athlete, who specializes in the 400 metres hurdles.

His personal best time is 49.17 seconds, achieved in June 2005 in Florence.

Achievements

References

1982 births
Living people
Sportspeople from Cluj-Napoca
German male hurdlers